The Donald Roebling Estate, also known as Spottiswoode and Spotswood, is a historic residential estate in Clearwater, within Pinellas County on the West coast of Florida.

History
It was the home of inventor, engineer, industrial designer, and philanthropist Donald Roebling (1908–1959). It is located on the channel at 700 Spottiswoode Lane in Clearwater. Roebling bought and named the parcel of land Spottiswoode, in honor of his fiancée, Miss Spottiswoode.

Donald Roebling was the great-grandson of John Augustus Roebling who designed the Brooklyn Bridge, and grandson of Washington Roebling who was in charge of the bridge's construction.

The buildings were designed in the Tudor Revival style by architects Roy W. Wakeling and John Phillipoff, and the residence was completed in 1929. The estate includes the mansion, a boathouse on the Intracoastal Waterway, an 'engineering−inventions' machine shop, and other outbuildings.

Harbor Oaks
The estate was built in the Harbor Oaks Residential District, Clearwater's first planned residential development, that was opened in 1914 by Dean Alvord, a major developer from New York. The development offered then-innovative features such as paved streets, curbs, and sidewalks, underground utility and sewer systems, and tree lined parkways. Other original Harbor Oaks residents included author Rex Beach, Brooklyn Dodgers owner Charles Ebbett, industrialist Robert Ingersoll, and members of the Studebaker, Proctor, and Gamble families.

Landmark
On December 19, 1979, the Donald Roebling Estate was added to the US National Register of Historic Places.

The estate is also protected within the Harbor Oaks Historic District.

References

Gallery

External links
 National Register of Historic Places.com: Pinellas County listings website 
 Florida Office of Cultural and Historical Programs.com: Pinellas County listings website
 Florida Office of Cultural and Historical Programs — organization website

Houses in Pinellas County, Florida
Buildings and structures in Clearwater, Florida
Houses completed in 1929
Houses on the National Register of Historic Places in Florida
National Register of Historic Places in Pinellas County, Florida
1929 establishments in Florida
Renaissance Revival architecture in Florida
Tudor Revival architecture in the United States
Roebling family